Madge may refer to:

Places
 Madge, Wisconsin, United States, a town
 Madge (community), Wisconsin, an unincorporated community
 Madge Lake, Saskatchewan, Canada

People
 Madge (given name)
 Madge (surname)
 Nickname of Madonna (born 1958)

Other uses
 Madge baronets, a title in the Baronetage of the United Kingdom
 Cyclone Madge (1973)
 Madge, NATO reporting name for the Beriev Be-6, a Soviet flying boat of the 1950s and 1960s
 Madge Networks, a company working in high-speed networking solutions in the mid 1990s
 Madge, a character from the TV series Thomas & Friends